World Premiere is the fourth album released by rap group, Partners-N-Crime. It was released on August 7, 2001 for South Coast Music.

Track listing

 "Intro"
 "Catch the Wall"
 "Holla at Me (Feat. 5th Ward Webbie & Bayou Boy)"
 "Do Whatcha Do"
 "Who Dat (Feat. Fiend of Ruff Ryders)"
 "Touch Yo Toes (Feat. 5th Ward Webbie & Cris-Style)"
 "Take Me Home (Feat. Ms Tee)"
 "I've Been Watching You (Feat. N-Dow)"
 "Broke Talk"
 "The Heist (Feat. Lil Slim)"
 "Dat Boy A Dog (Feat. Ms Tee)"
 "Band Talk"
 "Shake Yo Rump (Feat. Ms Tee)"
 "I Like The Way (Feat. Kango)"
 "Money (Feat. Kane & Abel)"

2001 albums
Partners-N-Crime albums